This is a list of pedestrian zones: urban streets where vehicle traffic has been restricted or eliminated for pedestrian use only. These are usually pedestrianised urban centres of a city, town or district with a residential population that have been retrofitted.

See also
 Carfree city
 Car-free movement
 List of car-free islands
 Low Traffic Neighbourhood
 Pedestrian malls in the United States
 Pedestrian zone

References 

|Pedestrian zones
Pedestrian zones

Pedestrian zones